Ryan Price may refer to:
 Ryan Price (trainer), British horse trainer
 Ryan Price (English footballer)
 Ryan Price (American soccer)